The bay-capped wren-spinetail (Spartonoica maluroides) is a species of bird in the family Furnariidae. It is the only species placed in the genus Spartonoica.

It is found in mid-northern Argentina, Uruguay and extreme southeastern Brazil. Its natural habitats are swamps and intermittent saline marshes. It is threatened by habitat loss.

Within the ovenbird family, the bay-capped wren-spinetail is genetically most closely related to the cacholotes in the genus Pseudoseisura. The species is monotypic: no subspecies are recognised.

References

bay-capped wren-spinetail
Birds of Argentina
Birds of the Pampas
Birds of Uruguay
bay-capped wren-spinetail
Taxonomy articles created by Polbot